R. robustus  may refer to:
 Repenomamus robustus, a large mammal species known from the Cretaceous period of China
 Rotylenchus robustus, the Thorne's lance nematode, a plant pathogenic nematode species
 Rivulus robustus, the rivulus almirante, a fish species endemic to Mexico

See also
 Robustus (disambiguation)